James Stoddart Karthaus (23 June 1898 – 20 October 1989) was  a former Australian rules footballer who played with Richmond in the Victorian Football League (VFL).		

Karthaus later played with Camberwell in the Victorian Football Association (VFA).

Notes

External links 

		
Jim Karthaus's playing statistics from The VFA Project

1898 births
1989 deaths
Australian rules footballers from Victoria (Australia)
Richmond Football Club players
Camberwell Football Club players